Gâmbia – Pontes – Alto da Guerra is a Portuguese parish, located in the municipality of Setúbal. The population in 2011 was 5,885, in an area of 32.97 km2.

References

External links
 Parish Hall official website

Freguesias of Setúbal